This is a list of episodes for the second season of DreamWorks Animation's animated television series, The Penguins of Madagascar. It began airing on Nickelodeon in the United States on March 13, 2010, and concluded on March 31, 2012.

Episodes

DVD releases

References 

 General references that apply to most episodes
 
 

2010 American television seasons
2011 American television seasons
2012 American television seasons